Roman Cieślewicz (13 January 1930 in Lwów Poland now Lviv Ukraine as Roman Cieślewicz – 21 January 1996 in Antony, France) was a Polish (naturalized French) graphic artist and photographer.

From 1943 to 1946 he attended the School of Artistic Industry in Lvov and from 1947 to 1949 attended the Krakow's Fine Arts Lycee. He studied at Kraków Academy of Fine Arts from 1949 to 1955.  He was an artistic editor of "Ty i Ja" monthly (Warsaw) 1959–1962.  In 1963, he moved to France and naturalized in 1971. He worked as art director of Vogue, Elle (1965–1969) and Mafia - advertising agency (1969–1972) and was artistic creator of Opus International (1967–1969). Kitsch (1970–1971) and Cnac-archives (1971–1974). Taught at the Ecole Superieure d'Arts Graphiques (ESAG) in Paris.
In 1976 he produced his "reviev of panic information" - "Kamikaze"/No. 1/ published by Christian Bourgois.
In 1991 he produced "Kamikaze 2" with Agnes B. He took part in numerous group exhibitions of graphic, poster and photographic art and was a member of AGI (Alliance Graphique Internationale).

Major awards
1964 - Grand Prix, International Exhibition of Film Posters in Karlove Vary (Czech Republic)
1964 - Gold Medal, 1st Biennial of Industrial Forms in Ljubljana (Yugoslavia)
1972 - Gold Medal, 4th International Biennial of Posters in Warsaw (Poland)
1979 - Grand Prix for posters in Paris (France)
1984 - Bronze Medal, International Biennial of Posters
1990 - Grand Prix of "Art Graphique" (France)
1991 - Excellence Prize at Biennial of Graphic in Zagreb (Yugoslavia)
1992 - President Price, Biennial of Applied Graphic in Brno (Slovakia)
1993 – Second prize, Poster Biennale Lahti (Finland)
Source: theartofposter.com

Exhibitions
1972 - Musee des Arts Decoratifs, Paris France
1973 - Stedelijk Museum, Amsterdam the Netherlands
1974 - Muzeum Plakatu, Warsaw Poland
1978 - Stedelijk Museum, Amsterdam the Netherlands
1981 - Muzeum Narodowe, Poznan Poland
1984 - Kunsthalle, Darmstadt Germany
1986 - Galeria BWA, Łódź Poland
1987 - Galerie de Pret, Angres France
1993 - The Polish Museum of America, Chicago USA
1993 - Centre Georges Pompidou, Paris France
1994 - Narodowa Galeria Sztuki Wspolczesnej Zacheta, Warsaw Poland
1998 - Muzeum Plakatu, Warsaw Poland
2006 - Les Rencontres d'Arles, France
2010 - Royal College of Art in London, United Kingdom
Source: theartofposter.com

See also
Michel Bouvet
List of graphic designers
List of Polish painters
List of Polish graphic designers
Graphic design

References

External links
 Profile of Roman Cieślewicz at Culture.pl
 The French Dream: A Roman Cieślewicz Retrospective in Paris

1930 births
1996 deaths
Polish graphic designers
Polish emigrants to France
Polish poster artists
Polish art directors
Polish photographers